The 1969 Houston Cougars football team, also known as the Houston Cougars, Houston, or UH, represented the University of Houston in the 1969 NCAA University Division football season.  It was the 24th year of season play for Houston.  The team was coached by eighth-year head coach Bill Yeoman who was inducted into the College Football Hall of Fame in 2001.  The team played its home games in the Astrodome, a 53,000-person capacity stadium off-campus in Houston.  Houston competed as a member of the NCAA in the University Division, independent of any athletic conference.  It was their tenth year of doing so.  After completion of the regular season, the Cougars were invited to the Astro-Bluebonnet Bowl, where they defeated the Auburn Tigers.  Following the overall season, several players were selected for the 1970 NFL Draft.

Pre-season

Top 25 rankings
Houston was nationally ranked in the AP Poll for the pre-season with the #7 spot.  It was the first time that Houston had received votes in the pre-season for that poll since the 1953 season, and was the highest pre-season ranking for the team ever.  Outside of the 1967 season, it was the highest that Houston had ever been ranked in the poll.

Schedule

Game summaries

Florida
Houston opened the 1969 season ranked as #7 in the Pre-season AP Poll.  For its first game, the team traveled to Gainesville, Florida to compete against Florida of the Southeastern Conference at Florida Field.  Led by tenth-year head coach Ray Graves, Florida had not lost a season opener for the past three years, while Houston had not lost a season opener for the past four years.  It was the first time in history that the two teams had met.  The victory by the Gators was considered a major upset, as the #7-ranked Houston quickly fell to an unranked position following the game, while Florida rose to #12 in the AP Poll. Following the game, Florida eventually went on to earn a 9–1–1 overall record, and after the defeat of Tennessee in the Gator Bowl, a #14 national ranking the poll to finish the season.

Poll rankings

Coaching staff

References

Houston
Houston Cougars football seasons
Bluebonnet Bowl champion seasons
Houston Cougars football